Pisarovo may refer to the following places in Bulgaria:

Pisarovo, Dobrich Province, a village in General Toshevo Municipality
Pisarovo, Pleven Province, a village in Iskar Municipality